The 2022–23 Boston College Eagles women's basketball team represents Boston College during the 2022–23 NCAA Division I women's basketball season. The Eagles are led by fifth year head coach Joanna Bernabei-McNamee. They play their home games at the Conte Forum and are members of the Atlantic Coast Conference.

Previous season

The Eagles finished the season 21–12 overall and 10–8 in ACC play to finish in a three-way tie for seventh place. As the eighth seed in the ACC tournament, they lost to Florida State in the First Round.

Off-season

Departures

Recruiting Class

Source:

Roster

Schedule

Source:

|-
!colspan=9 style=| Regular season

|-
!colspan=9 style=| ACC Women's Tournament

Rankings

Coaches did not release a Week 2 poll and AP does not release a poll after the NCAA Tournament.

See also
 2022–23 Boston College Eagles men's basketball team

References

Boston College Eagles women's basketball seasons
Boston College
Boston College Eagles women's basketball
Boston College Eagles women's basketball
Boston College Eagles women's basketball
Boston College Eagles women's basketball